Sportsweek is a topical sports show broadcast on BBC Radio 5 Live. The show airs on Sunday mornings and is presented by Garry Richardson, who is also a presenter on the Today show on BBC Radio 4. The show is produced by Richardson's own production company, Frontpage Media.

Format
Richardson interviews a host of well-known names from the world of sport throughout the 60-minute show, often pressing his guest for information. On the show he is famous for asking questions to interviewees three times in order to elicit the response he is looking for.

Awards  
The show won an award for Best Sports Programme at the Sony Awards in 2007. It was the second 5 Live radio show to win a Sony Award that year, with 5 Live Breakfast picking up the award for News and Current Affairs Programme.

Famous presenters 
 Garry Richardson
 John Watson
 Hugh Woozencroft (broadcast assistant)

References

External links 
 

British sports radio programmes
BBC Radio 5 Live programmes